Sumner Jules Glimcher (born June 4, 1924, in Boston, Massachusetts, died February 27, 2018, in Bolder, Colorado) was a professor, author and filmmaker.

Biography

After surviving gunshot wounds at the Battle of the Bulge, Glimcher began an extensive career in communications, creating International Transmissions Inc, a precursor to CNN, and making documentaries Hiroshima, Alberto Giacometti, Confucius and September 11th. In between his media work, Glimcher taught at his alma mater Harvard University, along with Columbia University and New York University where he was Director of the Department of Film, Video and Broadcasting at the New York University School of Continuing Education. He lived in New York City where he operated a multimedia production company, Westminster Productions Inc. and produced and moderated monthly film screenings titled “Meet The Filmmaker” at the National Academy of Television Arts & Sciences New York.

Films
A Taste of Provence
The Panama Canal: The History and Operation
7 Days in September as himself

Books
“Movie Making: A Guide To Film Production”  
“A Filmmaker’s Journal”

References

External links
http://www.sumnerjulesglimcher.com

United States Army personnel of World War II
American educators
American male writers
American filmmakers
Writers from Boston
1924 births
2018 deaths
Harvard University alumni
Harvard University staff
Columbia University faculty
New York University faculty
American shooting survivors